Miss America 1978, the 51st Miss America pageant, was held at the Boardwalk Hall in Atlantic City, New Jersey on September 10, 1977. The pageant was televised on CBS, making this the last Miss America Pageant broadcast (as of 2022) by CBS, and the only one from 1966 through 1996 not televised by NBC.

Results

Placements

Order of announcements

Top 10

Awards

Preliminary awards

Other awards

Judges
 Frank DeFord†
 Gail Brown
 Mary Longley
 Robert Ruston
 Frances Briscoe
 Don McDonagh
 Eileen Farrell†

Contestants

External links
 Miss America official website

1978
1978 beauty pageants
1977 in New Jersey
September 1977 events in the United States
Events in Atlantic City, New Jersey